Major Mahadevan is a fictional character and the protagonist in the Major Mahadevan film series. The character was created by Major Ravi and is portrayed by Mohanlal. Mahadevan is a commanding officer in the Indian Army, who held the title Major and was promoted to a Colonel. He first appears in the 2006 film Kirthi Chakra, and later in the sequels Kurukshetra (2008), Kandahar (2010), and 1971: Beyond Borders (2017).

Major Mahadevan is one of the most influential characters to have appeared in Malayalam cinema. Mohanlal was given an honorary position as a lieutenant colonel in the Territorial Army of India by the Indian Ministry of Defence, taking into account his honest portrayal of an army man and the reach the character got through the films Kirthi Chakra (2006) and Kurukshetra (2008). The third installment Kandahar was released in 2010. He appeared in the latest film 1971: Beyond Borders in 2017.

Family
Mahadevan was married and had a daughter, Arathi Mahadevan with his wife, Sreekutty (portrayed by Lakshmi Gopalaswamy), who were killed in a bomb explosion. Both his wife and daughter appeared in the first film Keerthi Chakra. His father Sahadevan was a war veteran, an army Major, who had fought in the Indo-Pakistani War of 1971. Major Sahadevan appeared in the 2017 sequel 1971: Beyond Borders.

Appearances
Mahadevan appeared in four films:

 Keerthi Chakra (2006) (as Major Mahadevan)
 Kurukshetra (2008) (as Colonel Mahadevan)
 Kandahar (2010) (as Major Mahadevan)
 1971: Beyond Borders (2017) (as Colonel Mahadevan and Major Sahadevan)

References

Indian film characters
Film characters introduced in 2006
Fictional colonels
Fictional commanders
Fictional majors
Fictional military personnel in films
Fictional Indian Army personnel
Fictional special forces personnel